is one of the twelve constriction techniques of Kodokan Judo in the Shime-waza list.

Description
In English this technique can be translated as "sliding lapel strangle".

Escapes 
Brazilian Jiu-Jitsu, Theory And Technique, by Renzo & Royler Gracie,
describes the footlock counter to the backmount.

Technique history

Included systems 
Systems:
Kodokan Judo, Judo Lists
Lists:
The Canon Of Judo
Judo technique

Similar techniques, variants, and aliases

variants 
 Yoko jime(横絞)
 Tawara-Jime(俵絞)
Kyuzo Mifune demonstrates Tawara-Jime in The Essence of Judo and it is described in The Canon Of Judo.
 Jigoku jime

 Bow and arrow choke
The most frequent choke hold in the 21st century judo world.
 Nezumi tori（ねずみとり）
Examples of contest this finished
Judo at the 1964 Summer Olympics Men's Middleweight Knockout rounds Quarterfinal (1964-10-22)
Win Isao Okano (Japan) (5:18 Okuri eri jime) Lionel Grossain (France)  Loss
 Kote jime(小手絞),Ude shibori(腕絞り)
Examples of contest this finished
2017 Judo World Championships U57 kg Round 3
Win Hélène Receveaux(France) (1:49 Okuri eri jime)　Yunseo JI(South Korea) Loss　IJF movie

Alias 
Sliding collar choke

References

External links 
 Information on the Techniques of Judo.
 BJJ Gi

Technique description 
Graphic from http://www.judoinfo.com/techdrw.htm

Exemplar videos:
 Tournament from http://www.judoinfo.com/video8.htm;
 Demonstrated from http://judoclub.ca/videoclips.html;
 Animation from http://wikilecture.org.

Judo technique